Keytalk, styled KEYTALK, is a Japanese rock band. Their album HOT! reached the 4th place on the Weekly Oricon Albums Chart and their single "Starring Star" reached the 7th place on the Weekly Oricon Singles Chart. Their song "Ōka Ranman" is the first opening song of the anime television series Rin-ne and their song "Starring Star" is the second ending song of the anime television series Dragon Ball Super.

Discography

Albums

Singles

DVDs

BDs

Notes

References

Japanese rock music groups